Indian River School District is a name shared by several school districts in the United States.

Indian River School District (Delaware) of Selbyville, Delaware
Indian River County School District of Indian River County, Florida

See also 
 Indian River (disambiguation)
 Indian River High School (disambiguation)